(Main list of acronyms)


 T – (s) Tera – tesla – tritium

TA
 ta – (s) Tamil language (ISO 639-1 code)
 Ta – (s) Tantalum
 TA – (i) Target Acquisition – Teaching Assistant – (s) teraampere – (i) Territorial Army (UK) – (s) Tristan da Cunha (ISO 3166 digram)
 TAA – (i) Transparency Anti-Aliasing – (a) Trans Australia Airlines
 TAACOM – (p) U.S. Theater Army Area Command
 TAADCOORD – (p) Theatre Army Air Defence Co-ordinator
 TAAR – (i) Trace Amine-Associated Receptor
 TAC – (a) U.S. Tactical Air Command (1946–1992)
 TACAMO – (p) Take Charge and Move Out (U.S. military)
 TACAN – (p) Tactical Air Navigation
 TACC – (i) Tactical Air Control Centre – (USAF) Tanker Airlift Control Center
 TACCO – (p) Tactical Coordinator
 TACCSF – (i) U.S. Theater Aerospace Command & Control Simulation Facility
 TACDAR – (p) Tactical Detection And Reporting
 TACP – (i) Tactical Air Control Party – Technology Applications Certification Program
 TACSOP – (p) Tactical SOP (Standing Operating Procedure)
 TADIL – (p) Tactical Digital Information Link
 TADL – (a) Tactical Air Data Link ("taddle")
 TADSS – (i) Training Aids, Devices, Simulators, and Simulations
 TAF - (i) Trading Activity Fee assessed by FINRA to recover the costs of supervising and regulating firms.
 tah – (s) Tahitian language (ISO 639-2 code)
 TAI – (i) Target[ed] Area of Interest
 TAJ – (i) Tom and Jerry
 TAJT – (i) Tom and Jerry Tales
 TALES – (a) Technical Advice and Lexicon for Enabling Simulation
 tam – (s) Tamil language (ISO 639-2 code)
 TAN – (s) Tanzania (IOC and FIFA trigram, but not ISO 3166)
 TANJ – (a) There Ain't No Justice (used as expletive in the Ringworld novels)
 TANP – (i) Terrain-Aware Network Planner
 TANSTAAFL – (a) There Ain't No Such Thing As A Free Lunch (coined by author Robert A. Heinlein in his The Moon Is a Harsh Mistress)
 TAPPS – (a) Texas Association of Private and Parochial Schools
 TARDIS – (a) Time And Relative Dimension In Space (from Doctor Who)
 TARP – (a) Transparency Accountability Rights for Parents (coined by Karen Plumridge, founder of Black Ribbon Gold Heart)
 TAROT – (a) Télescope à action rapide pour les objets transitoires (French, "Transient Object Rapid Action Telescope")
 TAS – Tasmania (postal symbol)
 TASER – (a) Thomas A. Swift's Electric Rifle
 TASM – (i) Tactical Air-to-Surface Missile
 tat – (s) Tatar language (ISO 639-2 code)
 TAT – (i) Tourism Authority of Thailand
 TATP – (p) TriAcetone TriPeroxide

TB
 Tb – (s) Terbium
 TB – (p) Tuberculosis
 TBA – (i) to be announced
 TBBPA – (p) TetraBromoBisPhenol-A
 TBC – (i) to be confirmed, to be continued
 TBD – (i) "to be documented", "to be determined", or "to be decided"
 TBD – (i) Torpedo Boat Destroyer
 TBF – To be fair
 TBGRI – (i) Tropical Botanic Garden and Research Institute, India
 TBH – (i) To Be Honest
 TBL – (i) Turkish Basketball League
 TBM – (i) Tactical Ballistic Missile – Theatre Ballistic Missile
 TBS – (i) Turner Broadcasting System
 TBT – (p) Tributyltin

TC
 TCC – (s) Tarrant County College
 Tc – (s) Technetium
 TC – (s) Teracoulomb – Turks and Caicos (ISO 3166 digram) – United Arab Emirates (FIPS 10-4 country code; from Trucial Coast States)
 TCA – (i) Transformational Communications Architecture – (s) Turks and Caicos (ISO 3166 trigram)
 TCAS – (i) Traffic Collision Avoidance System
 TCAA – (i) Top Counter-Assault Agents
 TCBY - (i) The Country's Best Yogurt
 TCCCS – (i/a) Tactical Command, Control, and Communications System ("ticks")
 TCD – (s) Chad (ISO 3166 trigram)
 TCG – (i) Trusted Computing Group – Türkiye Cumhuriyeti Gemisi
 TCHD – (i) Truck Cargo Heavy Duty
 TCL – (i) Tool Command Language
 TCM – (i) Turner Classic Movies
 TCP – (i) Traffic Control Point – Transmission Control Protocol – Trichlorophenol
 TCU – (i) Texas Christian University
 TCWMS – (i) Tele-Center Workforce Management System
 TCW – (i) Tasty Coma Wife

TE
 te – (s) Telugu language (ISO 639-1 code)
 Te – (s) Tellurium
 TE – (i) Tactical Exploitation – (p) Testosterone to Epitestosterone ratio – (i) Tight end (American football; position generally not used in modern Canadian football)
 TEAL – (a) Tasman Empire Airways Limited
 Team – (a) Together everyone achieves more
 TEAMS – (a) The East African Marine System (fiber optic cable)
 TED – (a) Technology Entertainment Design prize
 TEEL – parts of a body paragraph in an essay: * T - Topic sentence E - Explanation  E - Evidence L - Link
 TEETH – (a) Tried Everything Else, Try Homeopathy (medical diagnosis in-joke)
 tel – (s) Telugu language (ISO 639-2 code)
 TEL – (a/i) Transporter, Erector and Launcher
 TELAR – (a) Transporter, Erector, Launcher And Radar
 TEMO – (a) Training, Exercise, and Military Operations
 TENCAP – (p) Tactical Exploitation of National Capabilities
 TER's(Stargate) – Transphase Emission Rods
 TERS – (i) Tactical Event Reporting System
 TES – (i) Tactical Event System
 TEST – (a) Thesaurus of Engineering and Scientific Terms
 TEU – (i) Twenty-foot equivalent unit (cargo capacity)
 TeVeS – (p) Tensor Vector Scalar theory

TF
 TF –
 (s) French Southern Territories (ISO 3166 digram)
 (i) Task Force
 (s) Terafarad
 (?) Too Far
 (i) Team fortress (hence TF2 is Team Fortress 2)
 Transformers
 T/F – (i) True/False (=Yes/No)
 TFMPP – (p) Trifluorophenylmethylpiperazine
 TFR – (i) Total Fertility Rate
 TFT – (i) Thin-Film Transistor
 TFTP –
 (i) Trivial File Transfer Protocol
 (i) Terrorist Finance Tracking Program

TG
 tg – (s) Tajik language (ISO 639-1 code)
 Tg – (s) Teragram
 TG – (s) Togo (ISO 3166 digram)
 TGA – (s) Tonga (IOC and FIFA trigram, but not ISO 3166)
 TGB – (i) Tres grande bibliothèque (French, "Very Large Library"), a sarcastic nickname for the Bibliothèque nationale de France
 TGIF – (i) Thank God It's Friday, Toes Go In First
 tgk – (s) Tajik language (ISO 639-2 code)
 tgl – (s) Tagalog language (ISO 639-2 code)
 TGO – (s) Togo (ISO 3166 trigram)
 TGT
 (p) Target (also the ticker symbol for Target Corporation)
 (i) Ticket Granting Ticket (computer security)
 (i) Tyrese, Ginuwine, Tank – see TGT (group) for their collaboration
 TGV
 (i) Tanjong Golden Village (Malaysian cinema chain)
 (p) [[Young Malagasies Determined|Tanora malaGasy Vonona]] (Malagasy, "Young Malagasies Determined" – political party)
 (i) Test Generation with Verification
 Train à grande vitesse (French for "High-Speed Train")

TH
 th – (s) Thai language (ISO 639-1 code)
 Th – (s) Thorium
 TH – (s) Terahenry – Thailand (ISO 3166 and FIPS 10-4 country code digram)
 tha – (s) Thai language (ISO 639-2 code)
 THA – (s) Thailand (ISO 3166 trigram)
 THAAD – (a/i) Terminal High Altitude Area Defence
 THB – (s) Thai baht (ISO 4217 currency code)
 THEGENTRY – (a) The High-End Group of Earth's New Technologies Research Yield
 THEL – (a) Tactical High Energy Laser ACTD
 THG – (p) Tetrahydrogestrinone
 ThG – (p) Graduate of Theology
 THSU - (a) Texas Health and Science University

TI
 ti – (s) Tigrinya language (ISO 639-1 code)
 Ti – (s) Tebi – Titanium
 TI – (s) Tajikistan (FIPS 10-4 country code) – (i) Thermal Imaging – Threat Identification – Training Instructor – Texas Instruments
 TIA – (i) Total Information Awareness initiative
 TIA – (i) Transient Ischemic Attack
 TIALD – (i) Thermal Imaging and Airborne Laser Designation
 TIAA-CREF – (i, pronounced as "T-I-A-A-cref") Teachers Insurance and Annuity Association – College Retirement Equities Fund
 TIBS – (a) Tactical Information Broadcast System
 TIC – (a) Troops In Contact
 TID – (p) Target Identification – (i) ter in die (Latin, "three times daily")
 TIGERS – (a) Topologically Integrated Geographic Encoding and Referencing System
 TIM – (a) Technical Information Memorandum – Technical Interchange Meeting – Toxic Industrial Material – Telecom Italia Mobile
 TIMS – (a) Tactical Internet Management System – The Institute of Management Sciences – The International Molinological Society – Thermal Infrared Multispectral Scanner – Thermal Ionization Mass Spectrometry – Travel Information Management Services – Tuberculosis Information Management System
 TINC – (a) There Is No Cabal
 TINY – That Is, Not You (internet slang)
 TIP – (a) Thermal Identification Panel
 tir – (s) Tigrinya language (ISO 639-2 code)
 tits – Toes in the Sand

TJ
 TJ – (s) Tajikistan (ISO 3166 digram) – Terajoule
 TJD – (i) Truncated Julian Day
 TJK – (s) Tajikistan (ISO 3166 trigram)
 TJS – (s) Tajik somoni (ISO 4217 currency code)

TK
 tk – (s) Turkmen language (ISO 639-1 code)
 TK – (s) Terakelvin – Tokelau (ISO 3166 digram)
 TKBL – (i) Türkiye 1. Kadınlar Basketbol Ligi, the Turkish-language name of the Turkish Women's Basketball League
 TKL – (s) Tokelau (ISO 3166 trigram)
 TKM – (s) Turkmenistan (ISO 3166 trigram)

TL
 tl – (s) Tagalog language (ISO 639-1 code)
 Tl – (s) Thallium
 TLPM – T1 Line Performance Monitor
 TL
 (i) Team Leader
 (s) Teralitre
 Timor-Leste (ISO 3166 digram)
 (p) ThermoLuminescence
 TL;DR (i) – Too long; didn't read
 TLATOJL – The Life and Times of Juniper Lee TLA
 (i) Three-Letter Abbreviation/Acronym
 (ii) 'Three-Letter Agency' (i.e. CIA, FBI, NSA, etc.)
 (i) Temporal light artefacts
 TLAM – (i) Tomahawk Land Attack Missile
 TLAR
 (i) That Looks About Right (chat shorthand)
 Transporter-Launcher And Radar
 TLC
 (i) Tender Loving Care
 The Learning Channel (now known strictly by the initials)
 Thin-layer chromatography
 T-Boz, Lefteye, Chilli
 Tables, Ladders, and Chairs (type of professional wrestling match)
 TLD
 (i) Thermoluminescent Dosimeter
 Top-Level Domain
 TLE
 (i) Temporal light effects
 TLI
 (i) Temporal light interference
 TLM
 (i) Traditional Latin Mass
 Tridentine Latin Mass
 Transaction Lifecycle Management
 (i) Temporal light modulation
 TLS
 (s) Timor-Leste (ISO 3166 trigram)
 (i) Times Literary Supplement

TM
 Tm
 (s) Terameter
 Thulium
 TM
 (i) Technical Manual
 Theater Missile
 Thematic Mapper
 (p) trademark (often written in small superscript type: TM or ™)
 (i) Turing machine
 (s) Turkmenistan (ISO 3166 digram) Tympanic Membrane
 TMA
 (i) Terminal Maneuvering Area (restricted flying zone)
 Texas Medical Association
 Tristeza y muerte de agave (Spanish, "wilting and death of agave") – a disease affecting the blue agave, from which the popular spirit tequila is produced
 TMAP – (a/i) Texas Medication Algorithm Project
 TMC – (i) The Movie Channel
 TMD – (i) Theater Missile Defense
 TMDK – (i) The Mighty Don't Kneel (Australian professional wrestling stable also active in Japan)
 TMI – (i) Too Much Information
 TMJ – (i) TemporoMandibular Joint (syndrome)
 TMM – (s) Turkmen manat (ISO 4217 currency code)
 TMNT – (i) Teenage Mutant Ninja Turtles TMO
 (i) Table Mountain Observatory
 Television match official (rugby union)
 TMP
 (s) East Timor (ISO 3166 trigram; obsolete 2002)
 (p) Temporary
 TMPG – (i) Transparent Multiplatform Gateway
 TMR – (i) Twin Main Rotors (helicopter type)
 TMS – (i) Transcranial Magnetic Stimulation
 TMT – (i) Thirty Meter Telescope
 TMTOWTDI – (i) There's More Than One Way To Do It (from Perl)
 TMZ – (i) Thirty-Mile Zone, an area in and around Los Angeles considered "local" under entertainment industry union work rules

TN
 tn – (s) Tswana language (ISO 639-1 code)
 TN
 (s) Tennessee (postal symbol)
 Teranewton
 Tonga (FIPS 10-4 country code)
 Tunisia (ISO 3166 digram)
 TNA – (i) Total Nonstop Action Wrestling, a former name of the professional wrestling promotion now known as Impact Wrestling
 TND – (s) Tunisian dinar (ISO 4217 currency code)
 TNO – (i) Trans-Neptunian Object
 TNT
 (i) Thomas Nationwide Transport, an Australian company that was one of the predecessors to the PostNL (previously TNT N.V) and the current TNT Express
 (p) TriNitroToluene
 (a/i) Turner Network Television

TO
 to – (s) Tongan language (ISO 639-1 code)
 T/O – (i) Theatre of Operations
 TO
 (s) Togo (FIPS 10-4 country code)
 Tonga (ISO 3166 digram)
 TOA
 (i) Table Of Authorities
 Total Obligation Authority (accounting)
 TOAD
 (a) Temporary, Obsolete, Abandoned, or Derelict site (urbanism)
 Towed Optical Assessment Device
 TOBS – (a) Time of OBServation
 TOC
 (a/i) Table Of Contents
 Tactical Operations Centre
 (i) Temporo-Occipital transition Cortex
 Top of Concrete
 To-do – (s) To-do-List
 TOG – (s) Togo (IOC and FIFA trigram, but not ISO 3166)
 TOGS – (a) Thermal Observation Gunnery Sight
 TOMS – (a) Total Ozone Mapping Spectrometer (satellite instrument)
 ton – (s) Tongan language (ISO 639-2 code)
 TON – (s) Tonga (ISO 3166 trigram)
 TOP – (s) Tongan pa'anga (ISO 4217 currency code)
 TOS
 (a) Tape Operating System
 Terms of service
 The Original Series, used to distinguish the first Star Trek TV series from other parts of the media franchise
 Tramiel Operating System
 TOT – (i) Time On Target
 TOW – (a) Tube-launched, Optically tracked, Wire-guided (anti-tank missile)

TP
 TP
 (s) East Timor (ISO 3166 digram; obsolete 2002)
 São Tomé and Príncipe (FIPS 10-4 country code)
 (i) Training Practice
 Trident Ploughshares
 TPE – (s) Chinese Taipei (IOC and FIFA trigram for the country also known as Taiwan)
 TPI – (i) The point is
 TPO – (p) Thrombopoietin
 TPS – (i) The Pennington School
 TPTB – (i) The Powers That Be (often used to refer to the people responsible for the content of TV series or movies)

TQ
 TQ – (i) Top Qualifier (similar to Pole Position in car racing)

TR
 tr – (s) Turkish language (ISO 639-1 code)
 TR – (s) Turkey (ISO 3166 digram)
 TRA – (i) Technology Readiness Assessment
 TRAC – (p) (U.S. Army) TRADOC Analysis Center
 TRACON – (a) Terminal Radar Approach Control
 TRADOC – (p) (U.S. Army) Training and Doctrine Command
 TRAIN – (p) Tourist Railway Association, Inc.
 TRANSCOM – (p) U.S. Transportation Command
 TRAP – (p) Tactical Receive equipment and related Applications
 TRASANA – (p) TRADOC Systems Analysis Agency
 TRD – (i) Towed Radar Decoy
 TRIGAT – (p) Third Generation Antitank (missile)
 TRIPS - (a) Trade-Related Aspects of Intellectual Property Rights
 TRL – (i) Technology readiness level
 Trp – (s) Troop
 TRP
 (i) Target Reference Point
 (p) Time of Reporting
 TRPF – (i) Tendency of the rate of profit to fall
 TRU – (a) Transuranic
 TRUEX – (p) Training in Urban Environment Exercise
 TRW – (i) Thompson Ramo Wooldridge Inc.
 TRY – (s) Turkish lira (ISO 4217 currency code)

TS
 ts – (s) Tsonga language (ISO 639-1 code)
 Ts – (s) Terasecond
 TS
 (s) Terasiemens
 Thunderstorm (METAR code)
 Tunisia (FIPS 10-4 country code)
 (i) TinySex
 Transsexual
 (i) "Tough Sh*t"
 TSA
 (i) Theatre Storage Area
 Time Slot Allocation
 Transportation Security Administration
 The Salvation Army
 TSCA – (a) Toxic Substances Control Act ("tosca")
 TSEC – (i) Transmission Security Encryption Code
 TSL – (i) Transportation Security Laboratory
 tsn – (s) Tswana language (ISO 639-2 code)
 TSN
 (i) The Sporting News (historic name of the periodical now known as Sporting News)
 The Sports Network
 tso – (s) Tsonga language (ISO 639-2 code)
 TSO
 (i) The Stationery Office (was HMSO until 1996)
(U.S.) TRICARE Support Office
 (i) Trans-Siberian Orchestra (band)
 TSOP
 (i) Tactical Standing Operation Procedure
 The Sound of Philadelphia (classic 1970s R&B instrumental)
 TSR – many, including terminate-and-stay-resident (program)
 TSSIA – (i) the subject says it all

TT
 tt – (s) Tatar language (ISO 639-1 code)
 TT
 (s) Teratesla
 (i) Terrestrial Time
 Tourist Trophy (Motorcycle sport)
 (s) Trinidad and Tobago (ISO 3166 digram)
 TTBAO - Things To Be Aware Of
 TTCT – Torrance Tests of Creative Thinking
 TTD – (s) Trinidad and Tobago dollar (ISO 4217 currency code)
 TTO – (s) Trinidad and Tobago (ISO 3166 trigram)
 TTFN – (i) Ta Ta For Now
 TTL
 (i) Tax, Title, License
 (i) Through-the-lens (photography)
 Time 'till live
 Time to live
 Transistor–transistor logic
 TTP
 (i) Tactics, Techniques, and Procedures
 Thrombotic thrombocytopenic purpura
 Trailer Transfer Point
 TTTEAF – Thomas the Tank Engine and Friends
 TTY – (i) TeleTYpewriter (Printer)
 TTYL – (i) Talk To You Later (Internet slang)
 TTZ – (p) Tetrazolium

TU
 TU – (i) Technische Universität'' (German for "Technical University") – Thammasat University (Thailand) – (s) Turkey (FIPS 10-4 country code)
 TUC – (i) Trades Union Congress
 TUG – (a) TeX Users Group
 TUI – (a/i) Text-based user interface (cf. CLI), among other uses
 tuk – (s) Turkmen language (ISO 639-2 code)
 TUN – (s) Tunisia (ISO 3166 trigram)
 TUNS – (i) Technical University of Nova Scotia
 Tur – (s) Turkish language (ISO 639-2 code)
 TUR – (s) Turkey (ISO 3166 trigram)
 TUSK – (a) Tank Urban Survival Kit
 TUV – (s) Tuvalu (ISO 3166 trigram)

TV
  – (i) Time value, a designation seen on some camera dials for shutter priority mode
 TV
 (i) Television
 (s) Teravolt
 (i) Transvestite
 (s) Tuvalu (ISO 3166 and FIPS 10-4 country code digram)
 TVA – (i) Tennessee Valley Authority
 TVG
 (p/i) Television Games (Network)
 (i) Tick, Very Good, Often used by School Teachers when marking homework etc. (Tick VG)
 TVR – (i) TreVor (Wilkinson) Racing
 TVS – (i) Tornado vortex signature

TW
 TWA - Trans World Airlines
 tw – (s) Twi language (ISO 639-1 code)
 TW – (s) Republic of China (Taiwan) (ISO 3166 and FIPS 10-4 country code digram) – terawatt
 TWAIN – (a) Technology Without An Interesting Name
 TWD – (s) Taiwan dollar (ISO 4217 currency code)
 TWE – (a) Trans World Entertainment
 twi – (s) Twi language (ISO 639-2 code)
 TWI – (i) The Welding Institute
 TWN – (s) Republic of China (Taiwan) (ISO 3166 trigram)
 TWP – (i) Technical Working Paper
 Twp - township
 TWS – (i) Thermal Weapon Sight – Track While Scan
 TWT - traveling wave tube
 TWX - telex
 TWIP – (a) Take What Insurance Pays – When a surgeon agrees to accept a lower payment than he ordinarily would for a procedure and not charge the patient the difference

TX
 TX – (s) Texas (postal symbol) – Transmit – Turkmenistan (FIPS 10-4 country code)
 TXV – Thermostatic Expansion Valve

TY
 ty – (s) Tahitian language (ISO 639-1 code)
 TYT – Take Your Time – Internet chat abbreviation

TZ
 TZ – (s) Tanzania (ISO 3166 and FIPS 10-4 country code digram)
 TZA – (s) Tanzania (ISO 3166 trigram)
 TZC – (p) Tetrazolium chloride
 TZS – (s) Tanzanian shilling (ISO 4217 currency code)

References

Acronyms T